C. gracilis may refer to:
 Caecilia gracilis, an amphibian species
 Cancer gracilis, the graceful rock crab or slender crab, a crab species
 Cardioglossa gracilis, a frog species
 Catocala gracilis, the graceful underwing, a moth species
 Chapmannia gracilis, a legume species found only in Yemen
 Charassognathus gracilis, an extinct cynodontia species
 Citrus gracilis, the Humpty Doo lime or Kakadu lime, a straggly shrub species found in the Northern Territory, Australia
 Clarkia gracilis, the slender clarkia, a wildflower species native to California
 Coccothrinax gracilis, the latanier, a palm species endemic to the island of Hispaniola
 Coelus gracilis, a beetle species endemic to the United States
 Coelurus gracilis, a coelurosaur dinosaur species
 Coluber gracilis, the graceful racer, a snake species found in India
 Conchoraptor gracilis, an oviraptorid dinosaur species
 Coniogramme gracilis, a fern species
 Coursetia gracilis, a legume species found only in Ecuador
 Cordicephalus gracilis, an extinct prehistoric frog species
 Crania gracilis, a brachiopod species in the genus Crania
 Cricosaurus gracilis, an extinct marine crocodyliform species
 Crocodilichthys gracilis, the lizard triplefin, a fish species
 Cryptotis gracilis, the Talamancan small-eared shrew, a mammal species
 Cynosurus gracilis, a grass species in the genus Cynosurus

Synonyms
 Callitris gracilis, a synonym for Callitris preissii, a conifer species found only in Australia

See also
 Gracilis (disambiguation)